Bob Pike (1940 – 20 May 1999), full name Robert Hughes Pike, was an Australian surfer who specialized in big wave surfing. One of four sons born to a former surf champion in Sydney, he was taught the fundamentals by his father and entered his first competition in 1958. Developing a passion for big waves, he became one of Australia's most famous surfers and travelled to Hawaii in pursuit of the best and biggest surf. However, he disliked the professional competition that increasingly took over the sport after the 1960s and withdrew from the public eye. He continued to surf until an injury in 1997 left him unable to stand on a board. He committed suicide in 1999.

Filmography

Pike appeared in the following surfing documentaries:

Locked In! (1964)
Stop the Wave, I Want to Get Off (1965)
The Endless Summer (1966) (cameo)

External links
 Bob Pike—biography at SurfLine

1940 births
1999 deaths
1999 suicides
Australian surfers
Suicides in New South Wales